Wien Gersthof is a railway station serving Währing, the eighteenth district of Vienna.

References 

Railway stations in Vienna
Austrian Federal Railways